ZP1 is an AM radio station owned by Paraguay's state broadcaster, Radio Nacional del Paraguay. ZP1 transmits on 920 kHz with a transmitter power output of 100,000 watts. Airing a public radio format, programs are in Spanish and in the Guarani languages. It is owned with FM sister station ZPV1, but the stations air different programming.

References

External links
Official website
Facebook page

Radio stations in Paraguay
1940s establishments in Paraguay
News and talk radio stations